Mount Beerwah is the highest of the ten volcanic plugs in the Glass House Mountains range, 22 km north of Caboolture in South East Queensland, Australia. It was formed 26 million years ago during the Oligocene Epoch of the Paleogene Period. Geologists estimate it may be only a third of its original height due to intense erosion.

It is one of the most visually prominent mountains in south-east Queensland. The first European settlers to ascend the peak were Andrew Petrie with his son John Petrie. Its name comes from the  words "birra, or "sky," and "wandum," "climbing up."

In the traditional Aboriginal story of the region, Mount Beerwah is the pregnant mother and Mount Tibrogargan the father of all the other mountains in the area. Local Aboriginal people consider the mountains sacred.

The mountain is composed almost entirely of trachyte. One side features a dramatic, inward leaning cliff face known as the Organ Pipes. At its base are a number of small caves.

Public access 

Mount Beerwah summit trail was controversially closed to climbing from 2009 - 2016, due to rock instability from bush fire. The Sunshine Coast Regional Council spent $400,000 on removing dangerous rocks and improving warning signs.

As at 2019, Mount Beerwah along with Mount Tibrogargan, Ngungun and the rest of the mountains with tracks remain open with maintained walking trails with the exception of Mount Coonowrin (which was permanently closed to public access in March 1999 due to the high risk of rock falls that had previously killed and injured climbers).

The views from the summit of Mount Beerwah are very rewarding. There is a 2.6 km trail up from a state government maintained parking lot. The start of the trail is a "level 5 difficulty" walk that turns into a climb that can be done without equipment. Even experienced hikers should not attempt this trail unless they have at least three hours of daylight and there is no chance of rain. Depending on fitness, climbers should plan on taking two to three litres of water per person.

See also

 List of mountains in Australia
 List of volcanoes in Australia

References

External links

 Photos of Mount Beerwah, Glass House Mountains

Glass House Mountains (Queensland)
Mountains of South East Queensland
Glass House Mountains, Queensland